Teemu Elomo (born January 13, 1979) is a Finnish former professional ice hockey player. He played in the SM-liiga for TPS and Blues.  He was drafted 132nd overall by the Dallas Stars in the 1997 NHL Entry Draft.  He is the younger brother of Miika Elomo who played two games in the National Hockey League for the Washington Capitals.

External links

1979 births
Living people
Fehérvár AV19 players
Arystan Temirtau players
Dallas Stars draft picks
Espoo Blues players
Finnish ice hockey right wingers
Herning Blue Fox players
Mora IK players
HC Nové Zámky players
Olofströms IK players
Rouen HE 76 players
Tingsryds AIF players
TuTo players
HC TPS players
Újpesti TE (ice hockey) players
Sportspeople from Turku
Finnish expatriate ice hockey players in Sweden
Finnish expatriate ice hockey players in Slovakia
Finnish expatriate ice hockey players in Hungary
Finnish expatriate ice hockey players in France
Finnish expatriate ice hockey players in Kazakhstan
Finnish expatriate ice hockey players in Denmark